Pitts Town Point Airport  is a public use airport located near Pitts Town Point on Crooked Island, Bahamas in the Bahamas.

See also
List of airports in the Bahamas

References 

Runway length at MYCP is 3,500 feet long. Width is 40 feet.  Asphalt

External links 
 Airport record for Pitts Town Point Airport at Landings.com 
 Airport Owner Crooked Island Lodge and Marina

Airports in the Bahamas